Joanna Elizabeth Story is a British historian whose speciality is the history of and relationship between Anglo-Saxon England and Carolingian Francia.

Biography
Story completed her doctorate at Durham University in 1995 with a thesis titled "Charlemagne and Northumbria: The influence of Francia on Northumbrian politics in the later eighth and early ninth centuries". 

A Professor of Early Medieval History at the University of Leicester, she has published a number of academic articles, and is the editor of a collection on Charlemagne. Her monograph Carolingian Connections: Anglo-Saxon England and Carolingian Francia, c. 750–870 was praised as "revealing, relevant, and a valuable contribution to medieval history and an extremely useful addition to the corpus of texts on this period in European history". Story worked closely with colleagues at the British Library on their major international exhibition and associated exhibition catalogue Anglo-Saxon kingdoms: Art, Word, War which ran from October 2018 to February 2019.

Bibliography

Monograph
Carolingian Connections: Anglo-Saxon England and Carolingian Francia, c. 750–870 (Ashgate, 2003)
Anglo-Saxon Kingdoms: Art, Word, War (Exhibition catalogue with Claire Breay (British Library Publishing 2018)

Edited collections
Charlemagne: Empire and Society (Manchester: Manchester UP, 2005). .
Anglo-Saxon England and the Continent (with Hans Sauer; Arizona Center for Medieval and Renaissance Studies, 2011). .

References

External links
Joanna Story's page at University of Leicester

Living people
Academics of the University of Leicester
British medievalists
Women medievalists
Year of birth missing (living people)
British women historians
Alumni of Trevelyan College, Durham